Lee Henderson is a Canadian writer, the author of The Broken Record Technique (Penguin Canada 2002), The Man Game (Penguin Canada, August 2008), and The Road Narrows As You Go (Hamish Hamilton, 2014). The Broken Record Technique won the 2003 Danuta Gleed Literary Award, which recognizes a first collection of short fiction by a Canadian author writing in English. The Man Game was shortlisted for the 2008 Rogers Writers' Trust Fiction Prize and won the 2009 Ethel Wilson Fiction Prize as well as the 2009 City of Vancouver Book Award.

He was born in Saskatoon, Saskatchewan, and raised there and in Calgary, Alberta. He currently resides in Victoria, British Columbia. His short stories have appeared in several publications and his journalism has been featured in The Vancouver Sun. His short story "Sheep Dub" was included in the 2000 Journey Prize Anthology and "Conjugation" appeared in the 2006 Journey Prize Anthology; it was shortlisted for the Journey Prize Award. He is a contributing editor for the visual art magazines Border Crossings and Contemporary, for which he writes on Vancouver art and artists.

Bibliography
The Broken Record Technique (2002), 
The Man Game (2008), 
The Road Narrows As You Go (2014)

External links
Official site

1974 births
Living people
Canadian male novelists
University of British Columbia alumni
Canadian male short story writers
Writers from Calgary
Writers from Saskatoon
Writers from Victoria, British Columbia
21st-century Canadian short story writers
21st-century Canadian male writers